This page details the records, statistics, and other achievements pertaining to Shaquille O'Neal.

NBA career statistics

Regular season 

|-
| style="text-align:left;"| 
| style="text-align:left;"| Orlando
| 81 || 81 || 37.9 || .562 || .000 || .592 || 13.9 || 1.9 || .7 || 3.5 || 23.4
|-
| style="text-align:left;"| 
| style="text-align:left;"| Orlando
| 81 || 81 || 39.8 || .599 || .000 || .554 || 13.2 || 2.4 || .9 || 2.9 || 29.3
|-
| style="text-align:left;"| 
| style="text-align:left;"| Orlando
| 79 || 79 || 37.0 || .583 || .000 || .533 || 11.4 || 2.7 || .9 || 2.4 || 29.3
|-
| style="text-align:left;"| 
| style="text-align:left;"| Orlando
| 54 || 52 || 36.0 || .573 || .500 || .487 || 11.0 || 2.9 || .6 || 2.1 || 26.6
|-
| style="text-align:left;"| 
| style="text-align:left;"| L.A. Lakers
| 51 || 51 || 38.1 || .557 || .000 || .484 || 12.5 || 3.1 || .9 || 2.9 || 26.2
|-
| style="text-align:left;"| 
| style="text-align:left;"| L.A. Lakers
| 60 || 57 || 36.3 || .584 || .000 || .527 || 11.4 || 2.4 || .7 || 2.4 || 28.3
|-
| style="text-align:left;"| 
| style="text-align:left;"| L.A. Lakers
| 49 || 49 || 34.8 || .576 || .000 || .540 || 10.7 || 2.3 || .7 || 1.7 || 26.3
|-
|style="text-align:left;background:#afe6ba;"| †
| style="text-align:left;"| L.A. Lakers
| 79 || 79 || 40.0 || .574 || .000 || .524 || 13.6 || 3.8 || .5 || 3.0 || 29.7
|-
|style="text-align:left;background:#afe6ba;"| †
| style="text-align:left;"| L.A. Lakers
| 74 || 74 || 39.5 || .572 || .000 || .513 || 12.7 || 3.7 || .6 || 2.8 || 28.7
|-
|style="text-align:left;background:#afe6ba;"| †
| style="text-align:left;"| L.A. Lakers
| 67 || 66 || 36.1 || .579 || .000 || .555 || 10.7 || 3.0 || .6 || 2.0 || 27.2
|-
| style="text-align:left;"| 
| style="text-align:left;"| L.A. Lakers
| 67 || 66 || 37.8 || .574 || .000 || .622 || 11.1 || 3.1 || .6 || 2.4 || 27.5
|-
| style="text-align:left;"| 
| style="text-align:left;"| L.A. Lakers
| 67 || 67 || 36.8 || .584 || .000 || .490 || 11.5 || 2.9 || .5 || 2.5 || 21.5
|-
| style="text-align:left;"| 
| style="text-align:left;"| Miami
| 73 || 73 || 34.1 || .601 || .000 || .461 || 10.4 || 2.7 || .5 || 2.3 || 22.9
|-
|style="text-align:left;background:#afe6ba;"| †
| style="text-align:left;"| Miami
| 59 || 58 || 30.6 || .600 || .000 || .469 || 9.2 || 1.9 || .4 || 1.8 || 20.0
|-
| style="text-align:left;"| 
| style="text-align:left;"| Miami
| 40 || 39 || 28.4 || .591 || .000 || .422 || 7.4 || 2.0 || .2 || 1.4 || 17.3
|-
| style="text-align:left;"| 
| style="text-align:left;"| Miami
| 33 || 33 || 28.6 || .581 || .000 || .494 || 7.8 || 1.4 || .6 || 1.6 || 14.2
|-
| style="text-align:left;"| 
| style="text-align:left;"| Phoenix
| 28 || 28 || 28.7 || .611 || .000 || .513 || 10.6 || 1.7 || .5 || 1.2 || 12.9
|-
| style="text-align:left;"| 
| style="text-align:left;"| Phoenix
| 75 || 75 || 30.0 || .609 || .000 || .595 || 8.4 || 1.7 || .6 || 1.4 || 17.8
|-
| style="text-align:left;"| 
| style="text-align:left;"| Cleveland
| 53 || 53 || 23.4 || .566 || .000 || .496 || 6.7 || 1.5 || .3 || 1.2 || 12.0
|-
| style="text-align:left;"| 
| style="text-align:left;"| Boston
| 37 || 36 || 20.3 || .667 || .000 || .557 || 4.8 || .7 || .4 || 1.1 || 9.2
|- class="sortbottom"
| style="text-align:left;"| Career
| style="text-align:left;"|
| 1,207 || 1,197 || 34.7 || .582 || .045 || .527 || 10.9 || 2.5 || .6 || 2.3 || 23.7
|- class="sortbottom"
| style="text-align:left;"| All-Star
| style="text-align:left;"|
| 12 || 9 || 22.8 || .551 || .000 || .452 || 8.1 || 1.4 || 1.1 || 1.6 || 16.8

Playoffs 

|-
| style="text-align:left;"| 1994
| style="text-align:left;"| Orlando
| 3 || 3 || 42.0 || .511 || .000 || .471 || 13.3 || 2.3 || .7 || 3.0 || 20.7
|-
| style="text-align:left;"| 1995
| style="text-align:left;"| Orlando
| 21 || 21 || 38.3 || .577 || .000 || .571 || 11.9 || 3.3 || .9 || 1.9 || 25.7
|-
| style="text-align:left;"| 1996
| style="text-align:left;"| Orlando
| 12 || 12 || 38.3 || .606 || .000 || .393 || 10.0 || 4.6 || .8 || 1.3 || 25.8
|-
| style="text-align:left;"| 1997
| style="text-align:left;"| L.A. Lakers
| 9 || 9 || 36.2 || .514 || .000 || .610 || 10.6 || 3.2 || .6 || 1.9 || 26.9
|-
| style="text-align:left;"| 1998
| style="text-align:left;"| L.A. Lakers
| 13 || 13 || 38.5 || .612 || .000 || .503 || 10.2 || 2.9 || .5 || 2.6 || 30.5
|-
| style="text-align:left;"| 1999
| style="text-align:left;"| L.A. Lakers
| 8 || 8 || 39.4 || .510 || .000 || .466 || 11.6 || 2.3 || .9 || 2.9 || 26.6
|-
|style="text-align:left;background:#afe6ba;"| 2000†
| style="text-align:left;"| L.A. Lakers
| 23 || 23 || 43.5 || .566 || .000 || .456 || 15.4 || 3.1 || .6 || 2.4 || 30.7
|-
|style="text-align:left;background:#afe6ba;"| 2001†
| style="text-align:left;"| L.A. Lakers
| 16 || 16 || 42.3 || .555 || .000 || .525 || 15.4 || 3.2 || .4 || 2.4 || 30.4
|-
|style="text-align:left;background:#afe6ba;"| 2002†
| style="text-align:left;"| L.A. Lakers
| 19 || 19 || 40.8 || .529 || .000 || .649 || 12.6 || 2.8 || .5 || 2.5 || 28.5
|-
| style="text-align:left;"| 2003
| style="text-align:left;"| L.A. Lakers
| 12 || 12 || 40.1 || .535 || .000 || .621 || 14.8 || 3.7 || .6 || 2.8 || 27.0
|-
| style="text-align:left;"| 2004
| style="text-align:left;"| L.A. Lakers
| 22 || 22 || 41.7 || .593 || .000 || .429 || 13.2 || 2.5 || .3 || 2.8 || 21.5
|-
| style="text-align:left;"| 2005
| style="text-align:left;"| Miami
| 13 || 13 || 33.2 || .558 || .000 || .472 || 7.8 || 1.9 || .4 || 1.5 || 19.4
|-
|style="text-align:left;background:#afe6ba;"| 2006†
| style="text-align:left;"| Miami
| 23 || 23 || 33.0 || .612 || .000 || .374 || 9.8 || 1.7 || .5 || 1.5 || 18.4
|-
| style="text-align:left;"| 2007
| style="text-align:left;"| Miami
| 4 || 4 || 30.3 || .559 || .000 || .333 || 8.5 || 1.3 || .3 || 1.5 || 18.8
|-
| style="text-align:left;"| 2008
| style="text-align:left;"| Phoenix
| 5 || 5 || 30.0 || .440 || .000 || .500 || 9.2 || 1.0 || 1.0 || 2.6 || 15.2
|-
| style="text-align:left;"| 2010
| style="text-align:left;"| Cleveland
| 11 || 11 || 22.1 || .516 || .000 || .660 || 5.5 || 1.4 || .2 || 1.2 || 11.5
|-
| style="text-align:left;"| 2011
| style="text-align:left;"| Boston
| 2 || 0 || 6.0 || .500 || .000 || .000 || .0 || .5 || .5 || .0 || 1.0
|- class="sortbottom"
| style="text-align:left;"| Career
| style="text-align:left;"|
| 216 || 214 || 37.5 || .563 || .000 || .504 || 11.6 || 2.7 || .5 || 2.1 || 24.3

Career ranking 
As of January 19, 2016
 Career – season

 Career – playoffs

 Only include statistics in which O'Neal is ranked in the top 250.

Awards and accomplishments

College 
Cited from College Basketball Reference's Shaquille O'Neal page unless noted otherwise.
 AP Player of the Year: 1990-91 
 Consensus All-America First Team: 1990-91
 Rupp Trophy: 1990-91
 UPI Player of the Year: 1990-91
 Consensus All-America First Team: 1991-92
 SEC Player of the Year: 1991-92

NBA 
Cited from Basketball Reference's Shaquille O'Neal page unless noted otherwise.
 4× NBA champion: 2000, 2001, 2002, 2006
 3× NBA Finals MVP: 2000, 2001, 2002
 NBA Most Valuable Player: 2000
 NBA Rookie of the Year: 1993
 2x NBA scoring champion: 1995, 2000
 3× NBA All-Star Game MVP: 2000, 2004, 2009
 15× NBA All-Star: 1993, 1994, 1995, 1996, 1997, 1998, 2000,   2001, 2002, 2003, 2004, 2005, 2006, 2007,  2009
 14× All-NBA:
 First Team: 1998, 2000, 2001, 2002, 2003, 2004, 2005, 2006
 Second Team: 1995, 1999
 Third Team: 1994, 1996, 1997, 2008
 3× NBA All-Defensive:
 Second Team: 2000, 2001, 2003
 NBA All-Rookie First Team: 1993
 12× NBA Player of the Month
 20× NBA Player of the Week
 4× NBA Rookie of the Month

United States National Team 
 Olympic medalist:
 Gold: 1996
 FIBA World Cup medalist
 Gold: 1994
 USA Basketball Male Athlete of the Year: 1994

Other 
 2× Rise & Grind Hero of the Day (2020, 2021)
 McDonald's All-American MVP (1989)
 Sports Illustrated NBA All-Decade First Team: 2000–2009
 2× Best NBA Player ESPY Award: 2001, 2002

NBA records and former records

Career 
Youngest player in NBA history to:
 1,000 rebounds
 Surpassed by Dwight Howard
 2,000 rebounds
 Surpassed by Dwight Howard
 3,000 rebounds
 Surpassed by Dwight Howard
 Record at least 40 points and 20 rebounds in a game.

Regular season

Field goals 
Most seasons leading NBA in field goal percentage: 10

Most consecutive seasons leading NBA in field goal percentage: 5, 1997-98–2001-02
 Tied with Wilt Chamberlain

Free throws 
Most free throws attempted in a game with none made: 11, December 8, 2000

Playoffs

Scoring 
Games scoring 10 or more points, career: 206
 Broken by Tim Duncan
Part of the first time in NBA playoff history when four players scored 30 or more points in the same game: Houston Rockets at Orlando Magic, June 9, 1995
 Includes Hakeem Olajuwon, Sam Cassell, and Penny Hardaway.
Tied by Kevin Durant, Klay Thompson, LeBron James and Kyrie Irving in a game between the Cleveland Cavaliers and Golden State Warriors on June 7, 2017

Rebounds 
Offensive rebounds, career: 867

Free throws 
Free throw attempts, career: 2,317

Free throw attempts, one postseason: 296 (2000)

Free throw attempts, 4-game series: 68, vs. New Jersey Nets, 2002 NBA Finals

Free throw attempts, game (regulation): 39, vs. Indiana Pacers, June 9, 2000

Free throw attempts, quarter: 25, vs. Portland Trail Blazers, May 20, 2000

Free throw attempts, half: 27, vs. Portland Trail Blazers, May 20, 2000

Finals

Scoring 

Points, 4-game series: 145, vs. New Jersey Nets, 2002

Free throws 
Free throws made, 4-game series: 45, vs. New Jersey Nets, 2002

Free throw attempts, 4-game series: 68, vs. New Jersey Nets, 2002

Free throw attempts, 5-game series: 76, vs. Philadelphia 76ers, 2001

Free throw attempts, 6-game series: 93, vs. Indiana Pacers, 2000

Blocks 
Blocked shots, game: 8, vs. Philadelphia 76ers, June 8, 2001
 Tied with Bill Walton, Hakeem Olajuwon, Patrick Ewing, and Tim Duncan
Blocked shots, 4-game series: 11, vs. New Jersey Nets, 2002
 Tied with Elvin Hayes, George Johnson, Julius Erving, and John Salley,
Blocked shots, 5-game series: 17, vs. Philadelphia 76ers, 2001
https://reantimes.com/career-achievements-by-shaquille-oneal/ Career Achievements Biography of Shaquille O'Neal

NBA achievements

Regular season

Career 
 One of two players in NBA history to lead NBA Finals in scoring, but play on a different team the following season.
 Includes LeBron James.
 One of two players in NBA history to miss 5,000 free throws.
 Includes Wilt Chamberlain.
 One of three players in NBA history to record at least 20 points, 15 rebounds, and 8 blocks in a game by the age of 22. 
 Includes Tim Duncan and Anthony Davis. 
 One of five players in NBA history to change teams after averaging at least 25 points and 10 rebounds the prior season.
 Includes Kareem Abdul-Jabbar, Elvin Hayes, Moses Malone, and Kevin Love.
 One of eighteen players in NBA history to win multiple NBA scoring titles.
 Includes George Mikan, Paul Arizin, Neil Johnston, Bob Pettit, Wilt Chamberlain, Kareem Abdul-Jabbar, Bob McAdoo, George Gervin, Adrian Dantley, Michael Jordan, Allen Iverson, Tracy McGrady, Kobe Bryant, Kevin Durant, Russell Westbrook, James Harden, and Stephen Curry.

Season 
 Only player in NBA history to win the NBA scoring title without making a single three-point field goal in the season that they won the award. (since the introduction of the three-point field goal)
 One of two players in NBA history to receive all but one vote for the NBA Most Valuable Player Award in a single season.
 Includes LeBron James.
 One of two players in NBA history to be named Player of the Week in the first week of their rookie season.
 Includes Michael Carter-Williams.
 One of three players in NBA history to win NBA MVP, All-Star game MVP and Finals MVP awards in the same year (2000); 
 Includes Michael Jordan (achieved this twice) and Willis Reed.
 One of four players in NBA History to record at least 400 points during the first 15 games of a season at age 21 or younger.
 Includes LeBron James (twice), Michael Jordan and Kevin Durant.
 One of fifteen players in NBA history to record 30+ points in 10+ consecutive regular season games.
 Includes Wilt Chamberlain, Oscar Robertson, Kareem Abdul-Jabbar, Nate Archibald, Jerry West, Moses Malone, World B. Free, George Gervin, Michael Jordan, Karl Malone, Kobe Bryant, Tracy McGrady, LeBron James, Kevin Durant and James Harden.

Game 
 One of two players in NBA history to record at least 60 points and 20 rebounds in a game.
 Includes Wilt Chamberlain 
 Only player in NBA history to record at least 46 points, 21 rebounds, and 5 blocks in a game.
 Only player in NBA history to record at least 40 points and 20 rebounds in a game as a rookie.
 One of three players in NBA history to record at least 38 points, 16 rebounds, and 8 blocks in a game.
 Includes Hakeem Olajuwon (twice) and Dwight Howard.
 One of four players in NBA history to record at least 25 points, 15 rebounds, 5 steals and 5 blocks in a game.
 Includes Hakeem Olajuwon (four times), David Robinson and Dwight Howard.
One of four players in NBA history to record at least 17 points, 25 rebounds, and 7 blocks in a game.
Includes Hakeem Olajuwon, Dikembe Mutombo, and John Henson.

Playoffs

Career 
 Only player in NBA history to record at least 40 points and 17 rebounds in a playoff game at least seven times.

NBA Finals

Career 
 Only player in NBA history to score at least 30 points in all games in an NBA Finals series multiple times.
 One of two players in NBA history to win three consecutive NBA Finals MVP Awards.
 Includes Michael Jordan (achieved this twice).
 One of five players in NBA history to win three NBA Finals MVP Awards.
 Includes Michael Jordan, Magic Johnson, Tim Duncan, and LeBron James.

Game 
 One of two players in NBA history to produce outright game highs of points, rebounds, and assists in an NBA Finals game.
 Includes LeBron James.

Orlando Magic franchise records

Regular season 
Field goals made, game: 22, April 20, 1994

Field goals made, season: 953 (1993–94)

Minutes played, season: 3,224 (1993–94)

Offensive rebounds, season: 384 (1993–94)

Blocks, season: 286 (1992–93)

Personal fouls, season: 321 (1992–93)

Blocks per game, season: 3.5 (1992–93)

Blocks per game, career: 2.8

Blocked shots, game: 15, at New Jersey Nets, November 20, 1993

Playoffs 
Field goals made, game: 18, vs. Atlanta Hawks, May 8, 1996

Los Angeles Lakers franchise records

Regular season 
Offensive rebounds, season: 336, (1999-00)

Free throw attempts, half: 20, second half, at Golden State Warriors, March 14, 2002
 tied with Dwight Howard (second half, at Orlando Magic, March 12, 2013)

Playoffs 
Offensive rebounds, game: 11, vs. Sacramento, May 6, 2001

Offensive rebounds, career: 561.

Points, postseason: 707 points, (2000 Playoffs)

Blocks per game, career: 2.54

Blocked shots, postseason: 61, (2004 Playoffs)

Rebounds, game: 24, vs. Indiana Pacers, June 9, 2000

Miami Heat franchise records

Regular season 
Field goal percentage, season: .601 (2004–05)

Field goal percentage, career: .596

Playoffs 
Rebounds, game: 20, May 4, 2006

References

O'Neal, Shaquille
https://reantimes.com/career-achievements-by-shaquille-oneal/